Forbidden Trade (Spanish: Mercado prohibido) is a 1952 Spanish crime film directed by Javier Setó. Its plot concerns penicillin smuggling.

The film's sets were designed by Miguel Lluch.

Cast
 Modesto Cid 
 Isabel de Castro 
 Manuel de Mozos
 Manuel A. Deabella
 Alfonso Estela
 Manolo García
 Manuel Gas
 José Gayán
 Manuel Monroy
 Silvia Morgan 
 Carlos Otero 
 Jesús Redondo
 Miguel Ángel Valdivieso

References

Bibliography 
 Bentley, Bernard. A Companion to Spanish Cinema. Boydell & Brewer 2008.

External links 
 

1952 crime films
Spanish crime films
1952 films
1950s Spanish-language films
Films directed by Javier Setó
Spanish black-and-white films
Films scored by Augusto Algueró
1950s Spanish films